The Riley Lucas Bartholomew House is a historic house museum in Richfield, Minnesota, United States, originally the home of prominent early Minnesotan Riley Bartholomew (1807–1894).  The Richfield Historical Society operates the house as the Bartholomew House Museum adjacent to their Richfield History Center.

History
In 1852, when Fort Snelling was greatly reduced in size, the area that would become the city of Richfield became available for settlement.  Bartholomew came to the area and filed a claim on the shores of Wood Lake. He proceeded to build the two-story section of the home with local lumber, using white pine for the floors.  His wife, Fanny, and two children joined him in the spring of 1853. Soon after the construction of the house, two additions were added by moving two single story dwellings from near Minnehaha Falls and adding them on to the house. Bartholomew went on to become influential in local politics as a member of the Republican Constitutional Convention which framed the Minnesota Constitution in 1857. He also represented District Four in the Minnesota Senate.  Bartholomew, who earlier in life had risen to the rank of general in the Ohio militia, also joined a company of volunteers during the Dakota War of 1862.

The house is listed on the National Register of Historic Places for local significance in military and politics/government for its association with Riley Bartholomew.

See also
 National Register of Historic Places listings in Hennepin County, Minnesota

References

External links

 Richfield Historical Society

1852 establishments in Minnesota Territory
Federal architecture in Minnesota
Historic house museums in Minnesota
Houses completed in 1852
Houses in Hennepin County, Minnesota
Houses on the National Register of Historic Places in Minnesota
Museums in Hennepin County, Minnesota
National Register of Historic Places in Hennepin County, Minnesota
Richfield, Minnesota